Davit Janashia (born 8 July 1972 in Kutaisi) is a Georgian head coach and former footballer.

Career
Janashia started his career at hometown club Torpedo Kutaisi, he then moved to Samtredia in 1993, where he met name sake Zaza Janashia in the next season.

Janashia moved to the Russian (North Caucasus) side Zhemchuzhina Sochi in 1996. He then played for Chernomorets Novorossiysk but failed to play regularly. He moved back from his neighbour country and re-signed for Torpedo Kutaisi, where he won two Umaglesi Liga titles.

Janashia was signed for Dinamo Batumi in January 2002, after failed to play regular football at Lokomotiv Tbilisi. He rejoined hometown club Torpedo Kutaisi at the start of the 2002–03 season but was fired again in September. He was then signed by Samgurali Tskhaltubo of Pirveli Liga, before moved to Kazakhstani side Atyrau.

International career
Janashia made his Georgia debut on 2 September 1992 against Lithuania. In total, Janashia capped 8 times for Georgia, 6 in friendlies, one in UEFA Euro 1996 qualifying and one in UEFA Euro 2000 qualifying. In addition, Janashia was capped twice in non-A friendlies against Azerbaijan in 1992 and 1993, which at that time Azerbaijan was not yet a member of UEFA nor FIFA.

International goals

Coaching career
Janashia was appointed as coach of Torpedo Kutaisi in May 2007.

Personal
He is the brother of Kakhaber Janashia.

References

External links

1972 births
Living people
Soviet footballers
Footballers from Georgia (country)
Expatriate footballers from Georgia (country)
Georgia (country) international footballers
FC Dinamo Batumi players
FC Torpedo Kutaisi players
FC Zhemchuzhina Sochi players
FC Chernomorets Novorossiysk players
Russian Premier League players
Expatriate footballers in Russia
Expatriate footballers in Kazakhstan
Expatriate sportspeople from Georgia (country) in Russia
Expatriate sportspeople from Georgia (country) in Kazakhstan
Association football forwards